Svaha: The Sixth Finger (RR: Sabaha) is a 2019 South Korean mystery thriller film directed by Jang Jae-hyun, starring Lee Jung-jae, Park Jeong-min, Lee Jae-in, Jung Jin-young, Jin Seon-kyu and Lee David. The film was number one at the box office in its opening week, with a strong 840,000 sales and collected 1.18 million viewers in its first five days. It depicts a mystery involving a Buddhist sect while posing questions about faith in general.

Plot 
The story starts when Lee Geum-hwa and her twin sister are born. Geum-hwa's sister's fetus feeds on her leg and Geum-hwa is born with a deformed leg.  The sister, referred to as the thing was not expected to make it.  Their mother dies shortly after and their father commits suicide soon after.  Geum-hwa now lives in a remote village with her grandparents, who had recently moved there and raises dogs for a living. The sister is kept hidden from the public eye, locked up in a shed in the backyard. Her birth was never registered.  Some of the locals with the help of a shaman (woman) investigate the farm because the local livestock had been acting up.  When they investigate the shed, snakes crawl out of it and bite them.

Meanwhile, Pastor Park, a man who works at exposing cults, is hired to investigate a mysterious group called Dongbanggyo or "Deer Mountain." At the same time, the police also start investigating the body of a girl found buried in concrete.  An individual called Gwangmok pays a visit to his friend Kim Cheol-Jin a truck driver who admits he has failed Father.  He says the dead children come to visit him at night.  Gwangmok tells him to go ahead and die.  Autopsy on the dead girl reveals a talisman inside her mouth and the Pathologist recalls similar cases in the past.  Police trace the dead girl to Kim Cheol-Jin via the construction company he works for and when the police arrive he throws himself off the roof.  Gwangmok is given an information sheet on Geum-hwa by one of the Dongbanggyo members.  He starts to stake out Geum-hwa.  Gwangmok has nightmares about dead girls but they end with a woman consoling him with a song.

Park learns the scriptures of Dongbanggyo was written by a Kim Pungsa and finds an article about a Buddhist master Nechung Tenpa wanting to meet the founder of Dongbanggyo, Kim Je-seok.  Park learns that Kim Je-seok made a significant donation to a youth detention centre about 20 years ago.  He also learns that Kim Je-seok adopted four juvenile delinquents who killed their fathers.  One of the boys was Kim Cheol-jin.  Park reasons that three of the boys are dead based on drawings showing them as deities with halos.  The remaining deity is called Gwangmok.

Gwangmok is at Guem-hwa's place and plans to strangle her.  However, birds begin to fly through the window which confuses Gwangmok.  He then goes to the shed where the sister  is.  The sister grabs his leg from under the door and Gwangmok is frightened off.  Gwangmok goes to the Dongbanggyo Residence and speaks with a youthful Henchman tending the grounds.  He tells Gwangmok that the girl is the snake.  Gwangmok meets with his "Father" who is dying.  He recalls the Father giving him the moniker Gwangmok and saying that he is one of the stars who will protect the light.

Pastor Park speaks with Nechung Tenpa, who recounts an encounter he had in 1985 with the Master or Maitreya. He tells Park that the man has attained immortality.  He saw the Master's twelve fingers.  He says the Master is still alive despite being born in 1899. Park asks about the Donggonggyo scriptures which speak of a "snake" who will kill "the light."  Tenpa says that the snake is the natural enemy of the Master.  Tenpa said he delivered an oracle to the Master that his natural enemy will be born in the place where the Master was born in one hundred years and will turn out the light.  Park asks Tenpa about the numbers in the scriptures but he was not able to assist.  Park deduces that the cult founder Kim Je-seok is "the light," and the four "guardians" have been killing all the young girls born in 1999 at Yeongwul, Kim Je-seok's hometown.  He realizes the numbers in the scripture were actually birth registration numbers for all the girls.

Meanwhile, Gwangmok has kidnapped Guem-hwa and is preparing to kill her.  She asks why she has to die.  He says she is born evil but death is not the end.  Guen-hwa tells Gwangmok about her sister and asks him to kill her also so she can be reborn as a human in the next life.  Gwongmok finds the sister and prepares to strangle her.  She has shed her hideous appearance and has taken on the pose of a Buddha.  She tells him that she has been waiting for her and that she was the one who consoles him in his nightmares after he sheds blood.  She sings the same song to him as in his nightmares.  She tells him to look for the mark (six fingers) on the person he calls Father and to kill him.

Gwangmok returns to the Residence and tells the Henchman what happened.  He goes to check his dying Father's hand but he only has five fingers.  The Henchman lures Gwangmok to a barn and shoots him.  He puts Gwangmok in the back seat of a car and drives to kill Guem-hwa's sister.  Park also attend the residence and is confused why the old man is dying.  He hides and learns that the Henchman is actually Kim Je-seok and that the old man was just a disciple.

While driving Kim Je-seok (now revealed as the Henchman) tells Gwangmok that he will soon die. He tells him the man he called Father was actually his disciple.  He tells him he is the light and that Gwangmok is one of the stars that protect him.  He tells him not be sad about the acts they committed.  He tells him he has won the race against time and that there are things he must do for the world and offers for him to continue to serve.  Gwangmok goes to strangle him and tells Kim that he is a predator who is desperate to live.  The car eventually crashes.  Both are pinned with fuel dripping onto them.  Kim Je-seok is able to escape and starts to walk away.  Gwangmok retrieves an object that the sister had given him.  It turns out to be a lighter and he sets Kim Je-seok on fire killing him.

Geum-hwa who is still alive holds her sister while the sister passes away.

Cast

Lee Jung-jae as Pastor Park
Park Jeong-min as Na-han
Lee Jae-in as Geum-hwa
Jung Jin-young as Chief Hwang
Jin Seon-kyu as Monk Hae-an
Lee David as Joseph
Yoo Ji-tae as Kim Je-seok
Ji Seung-hyun as Kim Cheol-jin
Min Tanaka as Nechung Tenpa
Cha Sun-bae as Manager monk
Hwang Jung-min as Deaconess Sim
Lee Hang-na as Park Eun-hye
Jung Dong-hwan as unnamed disciple of Kim Je-seok
Moon Chang-gil as Geum-hwa's grandfather
Lee Joo-sil as Geum-hwa's mother
Cha Rae-hyung as Detective Jo
Oh Yoon-hong as Bodhisattva Yeon-hwa
Kim Hong-pa as Prison governor
Kim Geum-soon as Jecheon shaman
Park Ji-hwan as Jang-seok
Kim So-sook as Cheol-jin's mother
Kwon Gwi-bin as Na-han's mother 
Moon Sook as Myung-hee 
Lee Dae-hyeon as Dr. Noh
Bae Hae-sun as Autopsy doctor
Yoon Kyung-ho as Cattle shed owner
Jung Seo-in as Cattle shed owner's wife
Baek Seung-chul as Geum-hwa's father
Lee Sang-woo as Head monk

Production 
Principal photography began on November 19, 2017, and wrapped on April 9, 2018. The title Svaha was decided when a colleague of director Jang Jae-hyun recommended it. It is a term used in Buddhism when memorizing a certain series of events makes them "happen”.

90% of the scenes were shot on location, despite the cold reaching 20 degrees below zero in some areas. The production team devoted 90% of shooting to an entire location of Gangwon-do province with a mountainous area in South Korea. Cinematographer Kim Tae-soo also created blue-based water as a base to create a cool-toned cinematic atmosphere while preserving the cold tones for the season of winter. The camera movements and shooting styles also emphasize expressing the tension, which later is increased by more close-ups in the second half of the film.

Background 
Although Buddhism and esotericism are the main focus in the film, there are also elements of Maitreya, Shichuan and references to the Christian Bible as well. For instance, when the twin sisters are born, there's a reference to the biblical brothers Esau and Jacob. Jacob is said to have come out of the womb with his twin brother's heel. In the movie, this is similar to when "It" survived in the womb by eating her twin's leg. There is also the reference to Massacre of the Innocents when, just like King Herod the Great, Kim Je-Seuk who killed all of the infants born in a certain place to get rid of an enemy predicted to defeat him.

Release 
The film released on February 20, 2019, attracted 190,000 viewers on the first day and was number one in the box office. On the second day, it exceeded 2 million viewers, in total bringing in around 2.19 million audience members. This brings in cumulative sales of 20,007,508,194 won which is around  16,481,474.98 U.S dollars. Actor Jeong Dong-hwan, played the role of Kim Je-seok who after gaining enlightenment, his body never grows old. But the film faced some backlash when used a photo of Independence activist Na-Cheo for an earlier photo of the character Kim Je-seok. Na-Cheol was an independence activist known as the godfather of the anti-Japanese independence movement founded in Daejong Gyo, before the National Order of Merit was started. There was also a protest from Sincheonji, a Christian movement, over some scenes from the trailer. They were concerned when they say the trailer that the film could damage the group's reputation.

Awards and nominations 
At the 56th Grand Bell Awards, the movie got 8 nominations and won 2 awards. It won for Best Art Direction( for Seo Seong-kyeong) and Best Lighting( for Jeon Young-seok).

References

External links

 

https://movie.naver.com/movie/bi/mi/basic.nhn?code=167099#
https://movie.daum.net/moviedb/main?movieId=115191

2019 films
2010s mystery thriller films
South Korean horror films
Religious horror films
Films about cults
South Korean mystery thriller films
CJ Entertainment films
2010s South Korean films
2010s Korean-language films